Big Thicket Lake Estates is a census-designated place (CDP) in Polk and Liberty counties, Texas, United States. This was a new CDP for the 2010 census, with a population of 742, decreasing to 514 at the 2020 census.

Geography
Big Thicket Lake Estates is located along the southern border of Polk County and the northern border of Liberty County at  (30.487388, -94.767885). It is a residential community built around several artificial lakes, the largest of which is Bear Foot Lake, a reservoir built on Mill Creek, a tributary of Menard Creek and then the Trinity River.

Texas State Highway 146 forms the western edge of the community. The highway leads north  to Livingston and south  to Liberty.

Demographics 

As of the 2020 United States census, there were 514 people, 242 households, and 131 families residing in the CDP.

Education
Sections in Polk County are divided between the Big Sandy Independent School District and the Livingston Independent School District. Parts in Liberty County are in the Hardin Independent School District.

References

Census-designated places in Polk County, Texas
Census-designated places in Liberty County, Texas